Attila Böjte (born 2 September 1976) is a Hungarian footballer who currently plays as a defender.

References

External links
Profile on hlsz.hu 
Gyirmót SE squad
Profiel on pmfc.hu 

Living people
1976 births
Sportspeople from Győr
Hungarian footballers
Association football defenders
Hungary international footballers
Győri ETO FC players
Soproni FAC footballers
Mosonmagyaróvári TE 1904 footballers
Újpest FC players
Gyirmót FC Győr players